Martijn Keizer (born 25 March 1988) is a Dutch former professional road racing cyclist, who competed professionally between 2007 and 2017 for the , , , and  teams.

Major results

2005
 1st  Time trial, National Junior Road Championships
2006
 1st  Time trial, National Junior Road Championships
 5th Road race, UEC European Junior Road Championships
2007
 1st Overall Tour du Haut-Anjou
1st Young rider classification
1st Stage 2 (ITT)
 5th Overall Les 3 Jours de Vaucluse
2008
 6th Overall Tour du Haut-Anjou
 8th Overall Thüringen Rundfahrt der U23
2009
 3rd Time trial, National Under-23 Road Championships
 7th Overall Vuelta Ciclista a León
 9th Overall Tour of Turkey
2010
 1st  Time trial, National Under-23 Road Championships
 1st Stage 2 (ITT) Tour de Bretagne
 1st Prologue Circuito Montañés
 5th Overall Circuit des Ardennes
 5th Overall Olympia's Tour
 9th Liège–Bastogne–Liège U23
2011
 1st Boucles de l'Aulne
 3rd Time trial, National Road Championships
 3rd Duo Normand (with Jens Mouris)
 8th Overall Four Days of Dunkirk
2013
 1st  Mountains classification Ster ZLM Toer
2015
 2nd Overall Tour de l'Eurométropole
 8th Overall Driedaagse van West-Vlaanderen

Grand Tour general classification results timeline

References

External links

Martijn Keizer: Cycling Base
Martijn Keizer: Cycling Quotient
Martijn Keizer: Vacansoleil-DCM

1988 births
Living people
Dutch male cyclists
People from Menterwolde
UCI Road World Championships cyclists for the Netherlands
Cyclists from Groningen (province)
20th-century Dutch people
21st-century Dutch people